Mexican Hairless may refer to:

Mexican Hairless Dog, a rare, almost hairless variant of the Xoloitzcuintle dog 
Mexican Hairless Cat, an extinct and unrecognized breed
"Mexican Hairless", a song by Toadies from their 1994 album Rubberneck